Michael Stanhope may refer to:

Sir Michael Stanhope (died 1552) (bef. 1508–1552), Member of Parliament (MP) for Nottinghamshire
Sir Michael Stanhope (died c. 1621) (1549–c. 1621), MP for Ipswich, Orford and Castle Rising, son of above
Michael Stanhope (Royalist) (died 1648), colonel killed at the battle at Willoughby Field, Nottinghamshire
Michael Stanhope (priest) (died 1737), Canon of Windsor